Mono's 1998 tour, promoting the album Formica Blues, was the only tour undertaken by the band, which formed in 1996 and broke up in the years following the tour.

The inclusion of the single "Life in Mono" in the soundtrack to the 1998 film Great Expectations may have been responsible for an influx of radio requests for the song following the film's release. At the same time, however, Mono remained virtually unknown in their home country; the tour's destinations balanced out accordingly, with a dedicated U.S. leg but no dates in the UK at all. This was to be followed afterwards by additional U.S. concerts, with the band scheduled to join the 1998 Lilith Fair lineup during part of the U.S. leg of the traveling music festival.

In order to recreate the sounds of the Formica Blues songs in live performances, ADAT recordings were used alongside the musicians: guitarist, bassist, and drummer, plus band keyboardist, programmer, and producer Martin Virgo on keyboards and samples. In particular, the drum parts were a combination of pre-programmed as well as live.

Tour dates
The itinerary of the tour, as announced on 11 March 1998 on the band's official website, follows (with an amendment from other sources):

Shows
Concert reviews mention video projections being used, playing "pseudo-psychedelic background pictures" on "two 1-metre by 1-metre screens", flanked by "faux-Corinthian half-columns" that supported the projectors. The set ran 40–45 minutes, with up to two encores (reprising songs from the main set). Opening acts were sometimes present: The Devlins opened in San Francisco, while no band opened in Toronto. Attendance varied: the Toronto show was reportedly nearly sold out, while the Amsterdam show was reportedly underattended (beaten out by a simultaneous Björn Again concert in the adjacent hall). "Life in Mono" was the main focus, being used in a "sing-along session" at the Toronto concert, as well as being played again during one of the encores.

Reviewers complained about poor sound quality (including an inaudible guitarist) and singer Siobhan de Maré's speaking voice (including a "Cockney patter", and overly enthusiastic shouting described as more appropriate for arena rock). At the San Francisco show, audience members were reported walking out after "Life in Mono" had been played. The band members recalled more enthusiastic experiences, describing in a chat transcript audience members jumping onstage and dancing at the Seattle show.

Setlist
This setlist is from the April 25 Amsterdam concert. Nine out of ten songs from Formica Blues are played, leaving out "Hello Cleveland!", the only instrumental.
 "Silicone"
 sample
 "The Blind Man"
 "Disney Town"
 "The Outsider"
 sample
 "Slimcea Girl"
 "Life in Mono"
 "Penguin Freud"
 sample
 "High Life"
 "Playboys"
Encore:
 "Life in Mono"
 "High Life"

(However, the second encore was not played at this particular concert.)

Personnel
 Siobhan de Maré: vocals
 Martin Virgo: keyboards/programming
 James Thorp: electric/acoustic guitar, keyboards
 Magnus Box: bass guitar
 "Mikey (from Bristol)": drums

Electronic equipment used consisted of a Fender Rhodes electric piano, a Roland A-33 MIDI controller, and two digital samplers: a Roland S-760, and an Akai S3000.

Other promotion
The band played a handful of other promotional performances: a "Rolling Stone event" in New York City on March 26, The RuPaul Show on April 6, Loveline on April 7, KCRW's Morning Becomes Eclectic on April 9, Late Night with Conan O'Brien on April 14, and Modern Rock Live on April 19.

References

1998 concert tours